Education in the performing arts is a key part of many primary and secondary education curricula and is also available as a specialisation at the tertiary level. The performing arts, which include, but are not limited to dance, music and theatre, are key elements of culture and engage participants at a number of levels.

The endpoint for performing arts education varies: some educators integrate arts into school classrooms to support other curricula while simultaneously building students' art skills, and some focus on performing arts as an academic discipline in itself.

Performing arts integration
Performing arts integration in schools

Integrating performing arts into educational experiences can help students learn other subjects, such as science, as well as help them develop various non-arts-based skills. As children grow, engaging them in performance arts can help them meet developmental milestones, including those for motor skills and psychosocial skills. For example, teachers can integrate performing arts and the discussion thereof into their classrooms to honor student self-expression. Bilingual youth can benefit from this type of arts integration because it offers them modes of communication that can respond more easily to their culture and language than text-based or test-based learning. Regardless of the language used, teachers have found that using performing arts in the classroom, such as improvisational drama, can help students process and prepare for non-arts-based life situations, including bullying.

Performing arts integration out of schools

Performing arts integration that empowers students in these ways doesn't only happen in schools; community organizations, such as the Beat Nation Collective in Canada, use hip hop performance to help students deepen their understanding of and broaden their experience with indigenous identity and language.

Issues of access and equity

Despite the benefits of engaging students in performing arts, many students, particularly minority students such as African American and Latino students, do not have equitable access to performing arts in their school classrooms.

Discipline-based performing arts

The performing arts differ from the plastic arts insofar as the former uses the artist's own body, face and/or presence as a medium Performers often adapt their appearance by special clothing, stage makeup, etc.

For students pursuing elite professional careers in performing arts like classical ballet and circus arts, the physical demands are such that early entry into training can be essential.

The breadth of areas covered by the performing arts is wide, including:
Acting
Comedy
Drama
Magic
Film
Opera
Theatre
Music
Busking
Opera
Dance
Circus skills
Acrobatics
Juggling
Marching arts
Performance art

Prominent providers of performing arts education

Australia

Helpmann Academy
National Institute of Circus Arts
National Institute of Dramatic Art
Western Australian Academy of Performing Arts

India
Darpana Academy of Performing Arts
Kala Academy   *Meghalaya Academy of Arts

Kuwait
 Higher Institute of Musical Arts
 Higher Institute of Theatrical Arts

United Kingdom
 London Academy of Music and Dramatic Art (LAMDA), founded in 1861
 Royal Academy of Dance (RAD), founded in 1920
 Royal Academy of Dramatic Art (RADA), founded in 1904
 Royal Ballet School, founded in 1931
 Royal Central School of Speech and Drama, founded in 1906

United States
 Alvin Ailey American Dance Theater, New York City
 American Musical and Dramatic Academy (AMDA), New York City and Los Angeles
 Juilliard School, New York City
 Leland Powers School
 National Dance Institute
 New Orleans Center for Creative Arts (NOCCA)
 The New York Conservatory for Dramatic Arts (NYCDA), New York City
 School of American Ballet, Lincoln Center, New York City, the official academy of the New York City Ballet
 Un-Cabaret Laboratories, teaches alternative comedy writing and performance

See also
:Category:Schools of the performing arts
:Category:Drama schools
 Entertainment
 Performing arts
 Visual arts education

References

External links
Arts in the Massachusetts Arts Curriculum Framework
California Department of Education "Visual and Performing Arts Framework" Preschool to year 12

 
Performing arts
Entertainment